Ofir Netzer (born 13 May 1996) is an Israeli artistic gymnast.  She is the 2018 FIG World Challenge Cup series champion and 2017 Maccabiah Games champion on vault.

Early life 
Netzer was born in Moledet, Israel. She was a soldier in the Israel Defense Forces but held a special status for outstanding athletes that enabled her to serve close to home so that she could continue training and travel overseas when needed.

Gymnastics career

Senior

2013
Netzer competed at the 2013 Cottbus World Cup in March where she qualified to the vault final and finished in seventh place. In April she competed at the 2013 European Artistic Gymnastics Championships where she once again qualified to the vault final. She finished fourth behind Giulia Steingruber of Switzerland, Noël van Klaveren of the Netherlands, and Larisa Iordache of Romania. She later competed at the 2013 World Artistic Gymnastics Championships but finished thirteenth in vault qualifications and failed to qualify to the finals.

2014
In 2014, Netzer tore her ACL during training.

2015
Netzer returned to competition in March and competed at the Cottbus World Cup where she finished thirteenth in vault qualifications and did not make the finals. In April she competed at the Ljubljana Challenge Cup where she placed eighteenth in vault qualifications and once again failed to make the finals. She later competed at the 2015 European Artistic Gymnastics Championships. She finished fifteenth in vault qualifications and did not make the final.

2017
Netzer competed at the Sainté Gym Cup in March 2017 where Israel finished seventh in the team final. In April she competed at the Stella Zakharova Cup where she finished twelfth in the all-around, seventh on uneven bars, fifth on balance beam, and eighth on floor exercise. She later competed at the 2017 European Artistic Gymnastics Championships where she finished 63rd in the all-around qualification and did not qualify to any individual events. In May Netzer competed at the Koper Challenge Cup and the Osijek Challenge Cup but failed to qualify to any event finals. In July she competed at the 2017 Maccabiah Games where she placed eighth in the all-around, first on vault, and fifth on floor exercise. In September Netzer competed at the Varna Challenge Cup where she placed fourth on vault behind Rebeca Andrade of Brazil, Shallon Olsen of Canada, and Teja Belak of Slovenia. Later that month she competed at a Dutch Invitational where she placed tenth in the all-around and fourth on vault. In October she competed at the 2017 Artistic Gymnastics World Championships. During qualifications she placed sixty-first in the all-around and thirty-sixth on vault. She did not qualify to any event finals.

2018
In May 2018 Netzer competed at the Osijek Challenge Cup where she finished twelfth in vault qualification. She later competed at the Koper Challenge Cup where she placed fourth on vault behind Steingruber, Denisa Golgota of Romania, and Tjaša Kysselef of Slovenia. In July Netzer competed at the Israeli Championships where she won gold on every event. In August she competed at the European Championships but failed to qualify for any event finals. In September Netzer competed at the Szombathely Challenge Cup where she placed first on vault, earning her first gold medal at a FIG World Cup. A few weeks later Netzer competed at the Paris Challenge Cup where she placed fourth on vault. Due to her first-place finish in Szombathely and her fourth-place finishes in Koper and Paris, Netzer won the 2018 World Challenge Cup series on vault. Netzer was later selected to represent Israel at the 2018 World Championships alongside Meitar Lavy. During qualifications Netzer placed 19th on vault and did not qualify to the finals.

In late 2018, Netzer's longtime coach, Boris Kinev, died after being sick for months.

2019
In early 2019, Netzer relocated to Palma de Mallorca, Spain to train full time under Spaniard Pedro Mir after being unable to find a new coach in Israel.  Her first competition in 2019 was the Baku World Cup.  She finished 11th in the vault qualifications, 16th on uneven bars, 21st on balance beam, and 16th on floor exercise. She did not qualify to any event finals.

In June Netzer competed at the European Games, where she qualified to the vault final.  During the final she performed a handspring front tuck full and a Tsuk layout full and she finished fifth.

In August Netzer tore her ACL and therefore missed competing at the 2019 World Championships and was unable to qualify herself a spot for the 2020 Summer Olympics.

2021 
Netzer returned to competition in April 2021 to compete at the European Championships.  She finished 46th in the all-around and 12th on vault during qualification and did not advance to any event finals.  In October she competed at the World Championships where she qualified to the vault event final.  In doing so Netzer became the first Israel female artistic gymnast to qualify to an individual event final at a World Championships.  During the event final she finished sixth.

Competitive history

References

External links
 
 
 
 

1996 births
Living people
Competitors at the 2017 Maccabiah Games
European Games competitors for Israel
Gymnasts at the 2019 European Games
Israeli expatriates in Spain
Israeli female artistic gymnasts
Israeli female military personnel
Maccabiah Games gold medalists for Israel
Maccabiah Games medalists in gymnastics
People from Northern District (Israel)
21st-century Israeli women